Thongam Biswajit Singh is an Indian politician and member of the Bharatiya Janata Party.  He is a member of the Manipur Legislative Assembly since 2012 from the Thongju constituency in Imphal East district. Currently Singh is Minister For Environment, Forest and Climate Change and Power, Agriculture, Science & Technology. 

He was elected as Trinamool Congress candidate in 2012 but resigned in 2015. He joined Bharatiya Janata Party after resigning and contested the by election as Bharatiya Janata Party candidate and won the election.

References 

People from Imphal East district
Bharatiya Janata Party politicians from Manipur
Manipur MLAs 2012–2017
Living people
Manipur politicians
Trinamool Congress politicians
Manipur MLAs 2017–2022
Year of birth missing (living people)
Manipur MLAs 2022–2027